Deocharai is a village of Cooch Behar district, West Bengal, India.

References

Villages in Cooch Behar district